The  is a Japanese international school located in Tehran, Iran, attached to the Japanese Embassy. It used to be located in another area of Tehran.

It serves primary school through junior high school.

It opened on June 8, 1968 (Shōwa 43).

References

Further reading
 前田 雅彦 (前テヘラン日本人学校校長 愛知県北名古屋市立師勝東小学校　校長). "テヘラン日本人学校の学校運営" (Archive). - Tokyo Gakugei University

External links

 Japanese School in Tehran 
 Japanese School in Tehran  (Archive)
 Japanese School in Tehran  (Archive)
 "Japanese School in Tehran awarded a "School Prize" in JICA Essay Contest." (Archive) Japan International Cooperation Agency. February 13, 2013.

International schools in Tehran
Iran–Japan relations
Tehran
1968 establishments in Iran
Educational institutions established in 1968